Lawrence "Larry" Thomas Hart (born September 17, 1946, in Kansas City, Missouri) is an American athlete who won the gold medal in the men's hammer throw event at the 1975 Pan American Games. He set his personal best (68.84 metres) on June 11, 1976, at a meet in Westwood, Los Angeles, California.

Hart has continued throwing into the Masters age divisions.  On June 20, 2015, he set the American M65 record in the hammer throw, surpassing his own previous mark and that of former rival Ed Burke.

References

 trackfield.brinkster
 

1946 births
Living people
Track and field athletes from Kansas City, Missouri
American male hammer throwers
Athletes (track and field) at the 1975 Pan American Games
Athletes (track and field) at the 1976 Summer Olympics
Olympic track and field athletes of the United States
Pan American Games gold medalists for the United States
Pan American Games medalists in athletics (track and field)
Medalists at the 1975 Pan American Games
American masters athletes